Charles de La Rue (3 August 1643, in Paris – 27 May 1725, in Paris), known in Latin as Carolus Ruaeus, was one of the great orators of the Society of Jesus in France in the seventeenth century.

He entered the novitiate on 7 September 1659, and being afterwards professor of the humanities and rhetoric, he attracted attention while still young by a poem on the victories of Louis XIV. Pierre Corneille translated it and offered it to the king, saying that his work did not equal the original of the young Jesuit. He wrote several tragedies, published an edition of Virgil, and wrote several Latin poems. After having several times refused to permit him to go to Canada, his superiors assigned him to preaching; as an orator he was much admired by the court and the king. His funeral orations on the Dukes of Burgundy and Luxemburg, and that on Jacques-Bénigne Bossuet, his sermons on "Les Calamités publiques" and "The Dying Sinner" have been regarded as masterpieces by the greatest masters. He preached missions among the Protestants of Languedoc for three years. He was a most virtuous religious, and during his last years endured courageously great infirmities.

Publications 

 Panégyriques, Oraisons funèbres et Sermons de morale ; Paris 1719, in-8°; Lyon, in-12 ;
 A Carême and an Avent ; 4 vol. in-12 ;
 Lettre ; (Écrit destiné à défendre ce qu’il avait avancé en prêchant à Alençon en 1680 ; elle a été insérée par l’abbé Tilladet dans ses Dissertations sur diverses matières de religion et de philologie ; vol. I)
 Panégyriques des saints et Oraisons funèbres ; Paris, 1740, 3 vol.

See also 
 François de Paule Bretonneau

External links 
 "Charles de La Rue" by Abel Champon, in the Catholic Encyclopedia, 1910.
 De La Rue's "Prose Summary of Vergil's Aeneid" at the Latin Library.
 Charles de La Rue on data.bnf.fr

Writers from Paris
1643 births
1725 deaths
17th-century Latin-language writers
New Latin-language poets
17th-century French Jesuits
18th-century French Jesuits
17th-century French poets
17th-century French male writers
18th-century French poets
17th-century French dramatists and playwrights
18th-century French dramatists and playwrights
18th-century French male writers
Lycée Louis-le-Grand teachers